The 2016 season of Clube Recreativo e Desportivo do Libolo was the club's 11th season in Angolan football, and the 9th consecutive season in the Girabola, the top flight of Angolan football. In 2016,  the club participated in the Angola Super Cup, Girabola, Angola Cup and the CAF Champions League.

Squad information

Players

Staff

Pre-season transfers

Mid-season transfers

Angola Super Cup

Angolan League

League table

Results

Results summary

Results by round

Match Details

CAF Champions League

Preliminary round

1/16th Final

Angola Cup

Round of 16

Quarter-finals

Semi-finals

Final

Season statistics

Total results

Appearances and goals

! colspan="13" style="background:#DCDCDC; text-align:center" | Goalkeepers
|-

! colspan="14" style="background:#DCDCDC; text-align:center" | Defenders
|-

! colspan="14" style="background:#DCDCDC; text-align:center" | Midfielders
|-

! colspan="14" style="background:#DCDCDC; text-align:center" | Forwards
|-

! colspan="14" style="background:#DCDCDC; text-align:center" | Opponents
|-

! colspan="14" style="background:#DCDCDC; text-align:center" | Total
|-
| colspan="2"| || 253 || 49 || 33 || 7 || || 6 || || 9 || ||  || 71
|}

Top scorers

See also
 List of C.R.D. Libolo players

External links 
  
 Zerozero.pt profile

References

C.R.D. Libolo seasons
Recreativo Libolo